Variety Hour is a 1937 British musical comedy film directed by Redd Davis and starring Charles Clapham and Bill Dwyer. It is a revue show featuring a number of performers from radio and music hall.

It was made at Wembley Studios as a quota quickie by the British subsidiary of Twentieth Century Fox. The film's sets were designed by the art director William Hemsley.

Cast
 Charles Clapham as Radio announcer
 Bill Dwyer as Radio announcer
 Brian Lawrance as Band Leader 
 Jack Donohue as himself
 Helen Howard as  Herself
 Kay Katya and Kay as Themselves
 The Norwich Trio as Themselves
 Raymond Newell as Singer in Finale 
 The Music Hall Boys as Themselves
 Carson Robison and His Pioneers as Themselves
 The Wiere Brothers as Dancers

References

Bibliography
 Chibnall, Steve. Quota Quickies: The British of the British 'B' Film. British Film Institute, 2007.
 Low, Rachael. Filmmaking in 1930s Britain. George Allen & Unwin, 1985.
 Wood, Linda. British Films, 1927-1939. British Film Institute, 1986.

External links

1937 films
British musical comedy films
British black-and-white films
1937 musical comedy films
Films directed by Redd Davis
Films shot at Wembley Studios
Quota quickies
20th Century Fox films
1930s English-language films
1930s British films